Cranstoun may refer to:

People
Clan Cranstoun, Lowland Scottish clan
Lord Cranstoun, title in the Peerage of Scotland
William Cranstoun, 1st Lord Cranstoun (died 1627), Scottish Lord of Parliament
John Cranstoun, 2nd Lord Cranstoun (died c. 1648), Scottish Lord of Parliament
William Cranstoun, 3rd Lord Cranstoun (c. 1620 – 1664), Scottish Lord of Parliament 
James Cranstoun, 8th Lord Cranstoun (1755–96), officer of the Royal Navy
George Cranstoun, Lord Corehouse (died 1850), Scottish advocate, judge and satirist
Louisa Cranstoun Nisbett (1812–58), English actress
Reuben Cranstoun Mowbray (1883–1955), newspaper editor and member of the South Australian parliament
Si Cranstoun (born c. 1976), British singer

Other

HMS Cranstoun (K511), Captain-class frigate of the British Royal Navy that served in the last two years of World War II.